Laura T. Starks is an American academic administrator.

Starks earned a bachelor's degree at the University of Texas at Austin, a master's of business administration at the University of Texas at San Antonio, and returned to UTAustin for a doctorate. She was the Charles E. & Sarah M. Seay Regents’ Chair in Finance at the McCombs School of Business until her 2015 appointment as interim dean of the school. After Starks vacated the deanship, she was named George Kozmetsky Centennial University Distinguished Chair.

References

American women academics
University of Texas at San Antonio alumni
University of Texas at Austin alumni
McCombs School of Business faculty
American university and college faculty deans
Business school deans
Women deans (academic)
Living people
Year of birth missing (living people)